Horton Beach is located in Port Eynon Bay on the south coast of the Gower Peninsula in Wales.

It is reached from the nearby village of Horton via a steep hill, and has a car park sited a few minutes' walk away. Despite its accessibility and its popularity with surfers, the beach is usually very quiet and it has sand even at high tide.

External links
 www.geograph.co.uk : photos of Horton Bay and surrounding area

Beaches of Swansea
Gower Peninsula